El Tropicana Night Club in Havana, Cuba located in a lush, six-acre (24,000 m²) estate tropical garden opened on December 30, 1939 at the Villa Mina in Marianao. It is located next door to the old Colegio de Belén, presently, the Instituto Técnico Militar.

History

The Tropicana evolved out of a nightclub called Edén Concert, operated in the late 1930s by the late Cuban impresario Victor de Correa. The club was a combination casino and cabaret located on a rented property in Marianao from Guillermina Pérez Chaumont, known as Mina. The tropical gardens of the Villa Mina provided a natural setting for an outdoor cabaret. In December 1939, de Correa moved his company of singers, dancers and musicians into a converted mansion located on the estate. De Correa provided the food and entertainment, while Rafael Mascaro and Luis Bular operated the casino located in the chandeliered dining room of the estate's mansion. Originally known as El Beau-Site, de Correa decided to rename it The Tropicana. With a fanfare from the Alfredo Brito Orchestra El Tropicana opened on December 30, 1939. Martín Fox, a gambler rented table space in the casino. By 1950 he took over the lease of what would become The Tropicana, he hired Max Borges Jr. to design an expansion that would be known as Los Arcos de Cristal.

1956 Cabaret Yearbook

Truffin Ave. & Linea (B-4544).  "This claims to be the largest and most beautiful nightclub in the world.  Located on what was once an extensive private estate, Tropicana has two complete sets of stages, table areas, and dance floors.  If the weather is fine, the outdoor area is used; otherwise, everyone moves to the indoor area.  Tall palm trees growing among the tables lend the proper tropical atmosphere and blend well with the ultra-modernistic architecture.  Shows include 50-dancer chorus lines which often branch out into the trees.  Rhythms and costumes are colorfully native (voodoo is a frequent theme.)  Top names often star.  Minimum at tables is $4.50 per person, but this can be avoided by sitting at the bar which has an adequate view of the stage."

Architecture 

Max Borges designed a building composed of five reinforced concrete arches and glass walls over an indoor stage. When the indoor cabaret opened on March 15, 1952, it had a combined total seating capacity of 1,700 for the interior and outside areas. The furniture designed by Charles and Ray Eames. The Arcos de Cristal won numerous international prizes. The Tropicana was one of six Cuban buildings included in the 1954 Museum of Modern Art exhibit entitled Latin American Architecture since 1945. Henry Russell Hitchcock wrote the book Latin American architecture since 1945 for the occasion. Borges won the Premio , from the Colegio de Arquitectos in 1953 for his work on the Tropicana. The Arcos de Cristal can be seen in the Tropicana scene of the movie Our Man In Havana.

Trafficante

Santo Trafficante Jr. (November 15, 1914 – March 17, 1987) was among the most powerful Mafia bosses in the United States. He headed the Trafficante crime family and controlled organized criminal operations in Florida and Cuba, which had previously been consolidated from several rival gangs by his father, Santo Trafficante Sr. Reputedly the most powerful crime boss in Batista-era Cuba, he never served a prison sentence in the US. Trafficante turned his father's criminal organization into a multi-billion dollar international organized crime empire. Trafficante was reportedly a multi-billionaire and wielded enormous power and influence all over the United States and Cuba by paying off police, judges, federal prosecutors, city officials, government officials, local and international politicians, mayors, governors, senators, congressmen, CIA agents and FBI agents.

Trafficante maintained links to the Bonanno crime family, in New York City, but was more closely allied with Sam Giancana in Chicago. Consequently, while generally recognized as the most powerful organized crime figure in Florida throughout much of the 20th century, Trafficante was not believed to have total control over Miami, Miami Beach, Ft. Lauderdale, or Palm Beach. The east coast of Florida was a loosely knit conglomerate of New York family interests with links to Meyer Lansky, Bugsy Siegel, Angelo Bruno, Carlos Marcello, and Frank Ragano.

Trafficante admitted his anti-Castro activities to the United States House Select Committee on Assassinations in 1978. Though he vehemently denied any association with a conspiracy against President John F. Kennedy, at least one witness before federal investigators testified that Trafficante predicted the assassination in spring of 1963. Federal investigators brought racketeering and conspiracy charges against him in summer of 1986.
Santo Trafficante Jr. had been operating in Cuba since the late 1940s under his father, Santo Trafficante Sr., a mobster in Tampa, Florida. After his father died in 1954, he became the head in Tampa and took over his father's interests in Cuba.

Trafficante moved to Cuba in 1955, where he came into contact with Batista and Meyer Lansky. During the rule of Cuba's authoritarian dictator Fulgencio Batista, Trafficante openly operated the Sans Souci Cabaret and the Casino International gambling establishments in Havana. As a leading member of the syndicate, he also was suspected of having behind-the-scenes interests in other syndicate-owned Cuban casinos: the Hotel Habana Riviera, the Tropicana Club, the Hotel Sevilla-Biltmore, the Hotel Capri Casino, the Comodoro, the Hotel Deauville, and the Havana Hilton.
Trafficante was apprehended in November 1957, along with over 60 other mobsters, at the Apalachin meeting in Apalachin, New York. All were fined, up to $10,000 each, and given prison sentences ranging from three to five years. All the convictions were overturned on appeal in 1960. Cuba was one of the Apalachin topics of discussion, particularly the gambling and narcotics smuggling interests of La Cosa Nostra on the island. The international narcotics trade was also an important topic on the Apalachin agenda.
In January 1958, Trafficante was questioned by the Cuban police regarding the Apalachin meeting. A full report was made by the Cuban police, dated January 23, 1958, includes transcripts of long-distance telephone calls made from the Sans Souci during the period August–December 1957. The report was given to the District Attorney's office. In addition, "on January 23, 1958, the Cuban Department of Investigation, Havana, Cuba notified the Bureau of Narcotics that Santo Trafficante was registered in their Alien Office under No. 93461."

See also

Max Borges Jr.
Club Náutico
Colegio de Belén, Havana
List of buildings in Havana

Notes

References

Gallery

External links
Vanity Fair, An Oral History
Arcos de Cristal
Our Man in Havana, Tropicana Scene (1959 )
Latin American architecture since 1945, Author Hitchcock, Henry-Russell, 1903-1_Page 108-109. Text, photo and floor plan of Tropicana Night Club.

Nightclubs
Culture in Havana
Buildings and structures in Havana
Tourist attractions in Havana
1939 establishments in Cuba
Nightclubs in Havana
20th-century architecture in Cuba

sv:Tropicana (nattklubb)